David L. Petersen is the Franklin Nutting Parker Professor of Old Testament in the Candler School of Theology at Emory University. He is also an ordained Presbyterian minister.

Dr. Petersen received his Bachelor of Arts in 1965 from College of Wooster, a small Ohio liberal arts college affiliated with the Presbyterian Church.  In 1968 he earned a Bachelors in Divinity at Yale University followed by a Masters in Philosophy in 1970 and a Ph.D. in 1972 from the same school.

Since that time he has specialized in Old Testament studies, particularly research on the Book of Genesis and the writings of the Hebrew Prophets.  Petersen has written and co-authored numerous books and articles.  He was the senior Old Testament editor for The New Interpreter's Study Bible and has served as president of the Society of Biblical Literature.  He served as Old Testament editor on the new Common English Bible, published in 2011.

Works
Dr. Petersen's writings include:

Books

as Editor

References

External links
 Dr. Petersen's faculty page at Emory University

American biblical scholars
Emory University faculty
Living people
American Presbyterian ministers
Year of birth missing (living people)
College of Wooster alumni
Old Testament scholars
Translators of the Bible into English
Yale Divinity School alumni